Utricularia tubulata is a suspended aquatic carnivorous plant that belongs to the genus Utricularia (family Lentibulariaceae). Its distribution ranges across northern Australia from Western Australia through the Northern Territory and into Queensland.

See also 
 List of Utricularia species

References 

Carnivorous plants of Australia
Flora of Queensland
Flora of the Northern Territory
Eudicots of Western Australia
Lamiales of Australia
tubulata
Taxa named by Ferdinand von Mueller